All Saints Catholic High School, opened September 2002, is a secondary school in the Kanata district of Ottawa, Ontario. The school is located in the Kanata North area of Kanata Lakes and serves the communities of Kanata and West Carleton. The school motto is Dei Gratia, Latin for 'The Grace of God'. In 2005, All Saints students chose "Eddie the Yeti" as the school mascot.

History
The school opened on September 3, 2002. Monsignor Leonard Lunney presided at the official ceremony on behalf of Archbishop Marcel Gervais. The school was built on land which was previously owned by the Whalen family. 

The high school was designed in 2002 by architect Edward Cuhaci. A similar design was used for Holy Trinity Catholic High School, however All Saints increased the number of classrooms on the second floor. 

The school's first year of operation only saw classes from grade 7 up to and including grade 11 because they did not want to split up Grade 12 classes in their graduating year. In order to prevent over-crowding, the school capped the maximum number of students permitted to attend in the first year. All Saints High School's second year of operation saw classes ranging all the way to grade 12, with population limits beginning to max out.

In 2002 All Saints High School adopted St. Elizabeth School in Ottawa as its sister school and has supported it by providing the elementary school with over 4,500 books for its literacy program.

In June 2004, the school's first graduation ceremony took place. The class of 2004 built a rock cairn entitled "Cairn of Hope" at the front of the school, into which a time capsule was placed.

In its fifth year of operation, All Saints High School installed multiple portables in order to increase the maximum number of students that can be educated at the school, which would later be replaced by the expansion. An expansion to the school to add 30 rooms was completed in September 2007.

Sports
All Saints has much success in sports such as baseball, curling, X-country, Soccer, and Track & Field. In 2011 the varsity boys baseball team won the city championship. In 2008, the senior boys basketball team participated in the Bedford Road Invitational Tournament, where they won the coveted Sportsmanship Award. The 7/8 girls soccer team has won the city championships two years in a row, once in 2008 and again in 2009. In 2016, the Senior Boys Basketball Team won the tier 1 city championship against AY Jackson. In 2022, the Senior Boys Soccer Team won the tier city championship against Lisgar Collegiate Institute.

All Saints teacher Tom ("Vanilla Thunder") Kennedy is an inductee into the Stfx hall of fame for his contribution to the CIS winning 1999–2000 X-Men basketball team.

See also
List of high schools in Ontario

References

150 years of Catholic Education in Ottawa-Carleton 1856–2006, Ottawa-Carleton Catholic School Board, 2006

Middle schools in Ottawa
High schools in Ottawa
Educational institutions established in 2002
Catholic secondary schools in Ontario
2002 establishments in Ontario